The 1997–98 National Football League, known for sponsorship reasons as the Church & General National Football League, was the 67th staging of the National Football League (NFL), an annual Gaelic football tournament for the Gaelic Athletic Association county teams of Ireland.

The Kerry v Cavan Round 1 game was played at the Polo Grounds, New York City, to mark the 50th anniversary of the 1947 All-Ireland Final. The then Mayor of New York Rudy Giuliani threw the ball in ahead of the game.

Offaly won their first and only league title.

Format 
The teams are in four sections, three of 8 teams and one of 9. Each team plays all the other teams in its division once: either home or away. Teams earn 2 points for a win and 1 for a draw. The top two teams in each section contest the NFL quarter-finals.

Results

Group A

Group B

Group C

Group D

Knockout stage

Quarter-finals

Semi-finals

Finals

References

National Football League
National Football League
National Football League (Ireland) seasons